The Gilgit-Baltistan Council has been established as per Article 33 of Gilgit-Baltistan (Empowerment & Self Governance) Order, 2009. Its Chairman is the Prime Minister of Pakistan and the Governor of Gilgit-Baltistan is the Vice-Chairman over the six members-elected. It can legislate on 53 subjects as provided in Schedule III of the Order.

2016 election
Since the establishment of the GB Council, the election took place five years later.

 Arman Shah - PML-N
 Sultan Ali Khan - PML-N
 Muhammad Ashraf Sada - PML-N
 Wazir Ikhlaq Hussain - PML-N
 Syed Muhammad Abbas - ITP
 Syed Afzal - ITP

2021 election
Six members were elected in the 2021 GB Council election.

 Hashmatullah Khan - PTI
 Abdul Rehman - PTI
 Syed Shabia Al Hasnain - PTI
 Ahmed Ali Noori - PTI
 Muhammad Ayub Shah - PPP
 Iqbal Naseer - PML-N

See also
 Ministry of Kashmir Affairs & Gilgit Baltistan
 Azad Jammu and Kashmir Council
 Gilgit-Baltistan Legislative Assembly
 Government of Gilgit-Baltistan
 Election Commission Gilgit-Baltistan

References

External links 
Official site

Government of Gilgit-Baltistan
2009 establishments in Pakistan
Government agencies established in 2009
Gilgit-Baltistan Council